Zond program (Зонд; Russian for "probe") was a Soviet robotic spacecraft program launched between 1964 and 1970, using two spacecraft series, one for interplanetary exploration, and the other for lunar exploration.

Program details 
The program had two series of spacecraft. The first series, based on the 3MV planetary probe, was intended to gather information about nearby planets. The second series of test spacecraft were intended as a precursor to crewed circumlunar loop flights, using a stripped-down variant of Soyuz spacecraft, consisting of the service and descent modules, but lacking the orbital module

The Government of the Soviet Union had suppressed failed Space Race missions information to prevent bad publicity during the height of the Cold War and the Space Race. Since the fall of the Soviet Union in 1991, much previously restricted information became available.

Zond 1964A 

Zond 1964A a SL-6/A-2-e launch vehicle launched 4 June 1964, failed to achieve Earth orbit. The problem was found to be a faulty valve, that failed 104 seconds after launch. The payload was Molniya-1 No.2, a Soviet communications satellite.

Zond 1967A 
Zond 1967A was launched on 28 September 1967. The Soyuz 7K-L1 No.4L s/n 4 craft was 5,200 kg. Sixty seconds after launch the rocket veered off course. The escape tower took the Zond capsule safely away from the falling rocket. The rocket crashed 65 km downrange and ended the attempted Lunar flyby. The SL-12/D-1-e Proton launcher first stage had six engines. It has found that a fuel line of one engine was blocked by a rubber plug which had come loose. Had the mission been successful this would have been designated Zond 4.

Zond 1967B 
Zond 1967B launched on 22 November 1967 in an attempted Lunar flyby mission. The Soyuz 7K-L1 No.5L craft was 5,200 kg. A second stage failure occurred and the launch vehicle crashed 300 km downrange. The automatic system shutdown the other engines. The Zond capsule separated with the escape tower and was safely recovered. Had the mission been successful this would also have been designated Zond 4.

Zond 1968A 
Zond 1968A was launched on 23 April 1968. The Zond was on a Soyuz 7K-L1 s/n 7L. The craft was 5,600kg. The Proton K rocket exploded 4 minutes and 30 seconds after launch. Had the mission been successful this would also have been designated as Zond 5. The second stage rocket failed 260 seconds after launch. Another attempted Lunar flyby. The fault was found to be a short circuit in the control system that caused engine 2 of the SL-12/D-1-e second stage to shut down.

Zond 1968B 
Zond 1968B was planned to be launched on 21 July 1968 on a Soyuz 7K-L1 s/n 8L. On 14 July, while preparing for launch, the Blok D (second-stage) rocket exploded. The launchpad explosion killed three workers. The Proton first-stage booster rocket and the Zond spacecraft had only minor damage. Had the mission been successful this would have been designated Zond 7.

Zond 1969A 
Zond 1969A was launched on 20 January 1969, a Soyuz 7K-L1 s/n 13, was to be a lunar flyby and return to Earth with pictures. One engine of the SL-12/D-1-e second stage shut down 25 seconds early. This put the craft into an emergency system shutdown and aborted the flight. The escape tower fired and the Zond craft was returned to Earth safely. Had the mission been successful this would have been designated as Zond 7. The craft was 5,600 kg.

Zond L1S-1 

Zond L1S-1 failed on 21 February 1969, this was the first launch of the N-1 rocket, a super heavy-lift launch vehicle built to send a crewed Soviet spacecraft to the Moon, like the United States Apollo program. Just 66 seconds after liftoff the engine's turbopumps exploded.

Zond L1S-2 
The Zond L1S-2 (Zond-M 2) mission was to be the second test of the N-1 rocket engine, moded SL-15/N-1. Zond L1S-1, the first test N-1 rocket, had failed on 21 February 1969. L1S-2 - Zond-M 2 had a Zond capsule with Moon landing site cameras and a test Soviet Moon lander. L1S-2 goal was to put the lander into lunar orbit. Zond L1S-2 launched on 3 July 1969 at 23:18:32 Moscow time. A few seconds after liftoff, with the rocket at an altitude of about 180 meters, the main engines shut down. The powerful N-1 rocket crashed back on to launchpad and exploded 18 seconds after liftoff. The massive explosion destroyed Pad 110 East (110/38) at the Baikonur Cosmodrome. The Zond escape tower fired and the capsule landed clear of launchpad, about 1 km away. It was determined that engine 8's oxygen pump had failed and exploded. The explosion damaged the engine, which started an automatic shutdown of all the other engines. 

Two more subsequent tests of the N1 rocket failed: Soyuz 7K-L1E No.1 and Soyuz 7K-LOK No.1. With these four failures, the N-1 manned lunar program was canceled. NASA used the Saturn V rocket for lunar missions, a super lift rocket like the N-1.

Cosmos 154 

 Cosmos 154 failed to go into the planned translunar trajectory. The craft was 5,600 kg. Cosmos 154 was one of the first Zond attempts.

Zond 3MV-1 No.2 

Zond 3MV-1 No.2 launched 19 February 1964, exploded on the pad.

See also 

 List of unmanned aerial vehicles
 Timeline of Solar System exploration
 Moon landing

References 

Missions to the Moon
Zond program
Lunar flybys